East Hill is a mountain in Schoharie County, New York. It is located southeast of Middleburgh. Dutton Ridge is located south-southeast and Windy Ridge is located northwest of East Hill.

References

Mountains of Schoharie County, New York
Mountains of New York (state)